The African XI cricket team is a representative team of the continent of Africa and represents it during the Afro-Asia Cup.

History
The African cricket team originated when Jagmohan Dalmiya thought up the Afro-Asian Cup, which was to raise money for both the African Cricket Association and the Asian Cricket Council.
 The first tournament was held in 2005. The African XI team beat Asia XI by 2 runs, but lost the next match with the last match rained out. Their winless streak continues as they lost to Asia XI 3-0 along with a Twenty20 which did not have Twenty20 International or Twenty20 status in the 2007 tournament.

List of players

A One Day International, or an ODI, is an international cricket match between two representative teams, each having ODI status, as determined by the International Cricket Council. An ODI differs from Test matches in that the number of overs per team is limited, and that each team has only one innings.

Designed as a fund-raiser for the African Cricket Association and the Asian Cricket Council, the Afro-Asia Cup debuted in 2005 and the second tournament is being played in 2007. The list is arranged in the order in which each player won his first ODI cap for the African XI. Where more than one player won his first ODI cap in the same match, those players are listed alphabetically by surname. All the players have represented their respective member teams of the ICC at either Test or ODI level, but only the records of their games for the ACA African XI are listed.

The rules of ODIs have changed since the first Afro-Asia Cup. During the tournament, the ICC experimented with a rule called supersub – where the twelfth man would be allowed to take to the field in the place of one of the players and would be allowed to bat and/or bowl in his place, gaining a full cap in the process. As a result, this meant there were generally 12 capped players per match instead of the regular 11 – even though a player may have not participated in either batting or bowling in a match. For example, Monde Zondeki bowled for Africa XI during the second match, but was substituted for Steve Tikolo during the innings break and Tikolo went on to bat in his place instead; both players are listed as receiving a cap for this match. These rules were not in place for the 2007 Afro-Asia Cup.

Of the six matches to have been played to date, the ACA African XI has only won one match: the inaugural match at Centurion. However, they went on to lose the next ODI, and the final match of the 2005 competition was called off due to rain, leading to the trophy was shared.

In the 2007 competition, the African XI suffered a 3–0 whitewash, losing the first two matches by 34 and 31 runs respectively. Despite half-centuries from AB de Villiers, Justin Kemp and Shaun Pollock in the final ODI they went on to lose by 13 runs.

Shaun Pollock was the first player to score a century in the competition, during the first ODI of the 2007 competition, which led to him being named Man of the Match. He also has the most runs to his name between both African XI and Asian XI players.

Morné Morkel has the highest number of wickets for the African XI with 8, all captured during the 2007 series, and the second most wickets in the Afro-Asia Cup's history.

Statistics are correct as of June 10, following the conclusion of the 2007 series.

References

Cricket in Africa
2005 establishments in Africa
Cricket clubs established in 2005